Tracy Krumm is a textile artist, craft educator, and curator based in St. Paul, Minnesota. Krumm's work combines metalworking and crochet; crafting items such as curtains and clothing out of metals and wire.

Early life and education 
Krumm received her Bachelor of Fine Arts from the California College of Arts and Crafts in 1987 and her Masters of Fine Arts from Vermont College of Fine Art in 1995.

Art career 
In 2010, she curated an exhibition titled New Fibers 2010 at Eastern Michigan University where she was faculty in the fibers department. In 2014, the Ellen Noël Art Museum in Odessa, Texas showed In the Making: The Art of Tracy Krumm.  Her work was included in a 2019 exhibition of contemporary fiber art curated by Erika Diamond at the Jamestown Community College’s Weeks Gallery titled Pulling a Thread. She curated an exhibition titled Pride at the Textile Center in St. Paul, Minnesota, where she is the Director for Artistic Advancement. This exhibition was to be the first in the institution's history to celebrate LGBTQ+ identity.

Awards and exhibitions 
Tracy Krumm was awarded a $25,000 McKnight Fellowship for Visual Artists in 2015. In 2016, work won first place in the Textiles/fibers category of the Minnesota State Fair Fine Art Competition.

Further reading

References 

Artists from Saint Paul, Minnesota
American sculptors
American metalsmiths
American women artists
Women basketweavers
American weavers
Year of birth missing (living people)
Living people
21st-century American women